The 2006 Toronto Argonauts season was the 49th season for the team in the Canadian Football League and 134th season overall. The Argonauts finished the regular season 10–8 and finished in second place in the East Division.

Offseason
The Argos made a splash just before training camp when they lured high-profile RB Ricky Williams to Canada. The team also picked up QB and 2001 Heisman Trophy winner Eric Crouch.

CFL draft

Preseason

Regular season
Quarterback Damon Allen became professional football's all-time leading passer, moving ahead of Warren Moon on Labour Day in Hamilton. The team, however, was decimated by injuries at almost every position and the Argonauts stumbled out of the gate to a 2–5 record. Mid-season health bred new promise as the team gained the majority of its starters back including Allen and Williams, who both fell to injury early in the year. Upon his return, Williams joined forces with fellow RB John Avery to deliver a late-season one-two punch out of the backfield. Combined with the stellar play of their dominant defence, the Double Blue was able to turn the season around and win 8 of their remaining 11 regular season games to finish in a first-place tie with the Montreal Alouettes. The CFL tie-break rule landed the Argos in second place.

Season schedule

Season standings

Postseason
The Argos hosted the Winnipeg Blue Bombers in a thrilling East Semi-Final at Rogers Centre.  With the season on the line, QB Michael Bishop and LB Chuck Winters teamed up to lead the Boatmen to one of the greatest come-from-behind victories in recent Argo memory. The Argos fell to Montreal in the East Championship.

Awards and records
Despite their early exit from the playoffs, the Boatmen finished the season with 11 East Division All-Stars and three CFL All-Stars. Kicker/Punter Noel Prefontaine was once again named the East's Most Outstanding Special Teams Player and elusive receiver Arland Bruce III finished with a division leading 1,370 yards receiving and 11 touchdowns. A bright star on defence came in the form of CB Byron Parker. The speedy defender re-joined the Boatmen mid-season and made his mark in both the Argos and the CFL record books in only nine regular season contests. By season's end, the Tulane product had accumulated 8 interceptions for a CFL record 348 return yards and 4 touchdowns. Linebacker Mike O'Shea became just the third player, and first Canadian, in CFL history to record 1,000 or more defensive tackles in a career.

CFL All-Stars: Offence
 WR – Arland Bruce III

CFL All-Stars: Defence
 CB – Byron Parker

CFL All-Stars: Special teams
 P – Noel Prefontaine

CFL Eastern All-Stars: Offence
 WR – Arland Bruce III
 OT – Bernard Williams
 OT – Jerome Davis
 OG – Jude St. John

CFL Eastern All-Stars: Defence
 DE – Jonathan Brown
 LB – Kevin Eiben
 DB – Kenny Wheaton
 CB – Byron Parker
 CB – Jordan Younger
 DS – Orlondo Steinauer

CFL Eastern All-Stars: Special teams
 P – Noel Prefontaine

References

Toronto Argonauts
Toronto Argonauts seasons